The 1878 Welsh Cup Final, was the first in the competition. It was contested by Wrexham and Druids at the Acton Park, Wrexham.

Route to the final

Wrexham

Druids

Final
The final of the inaugural Welsh Cup tournament was played at Acton Park, Wrexham on 30 March 1878 between Wrexham and Druids of Ruabon. The pitch was donated by Sir R. A. Cunliffe, and was a roped off portion of land measuring 120 yards by 76. Entrance was gained via Rhosnessney Lodge with sixpence being charged for admission. The match was a cliffhanger, with no score until the Wrexham forwards charged the Druids' defenders to take the ball over the line to win the game in the final minute, with James Davies being credited with the goal.

References

1878
1877–78 in Welsh football
Wrexham A.F.C. matches
Druids F.C. matches